Loosdrecht is a town in the municipality of Wijdemeren, North Holland, the Netherlands, with a population of about 8,600 inhabitants.

Loosdrecht consists of two small villages: Nieuw-Loosdrecht and Oud-Loosdrecht. Nieuw Loosdrecht covers a small area densely populated; Oud-Loosdrecht consists mainly of lakeside villas. Until 2002 Loosdrecht was a separate municipality in the province of Utrecht, covering the villages of Oud-Loosdrecht and Nieuw-Loosdrecht, and the hamlets of Breukeleveen and Muyeveld.

The lakes are a hotspot for the well-to-do, with several exclusive yachting clubs and restaurants lining the shores. Smaller boats can visit the Vuntus and other quieter lakes on the northern side of Loosdrecht, connected to the main lakes through a small underpass.

See also

 Porcelain manufacturing companies in Europe
 Joannes de Mol

References

Municipalities of the Netherlands disestablished in 2002
Former municipalities of Utrecht (province)
Wijdemeren